Jillian May Gilbeau (born May 21, 1987) is an American soccer defender currently playing for Washington Freedom of Women's Professional Soccer.

References

External links
 Washington Freedom player profile
 Texas player profile
 LHSC Eclipse player

Living people
1987 births
Texas Longhorns women's soccer players
Washington Freedom players
American women's soccer players
Women's association football defenders
Women's Premier Soccer League players
Women's Professional Soccer players